The SIG Pro is a series of semi-automatic pistols developed by SIG Sauer in Exeter, New Hampshire.  It became the first polymer-frame handgun from SIG Sauer and one of the first pistols to feature a built-in universal accessory rail and interchangeable grips. Offerings in the series are chambered in .40 S&W, .357 SIG, or 9×19mm Parabellum.  , only the SP 2022 variant is still listed on the SIG Sauer website. The SIG Pro was marketed as a lightweight and compact alternative to the "legacy" SIG Sauer handguns in an increasingly competitive and budget-oriented law enforcement market.

Variants
There have been two generations of SIG Pro offerings, with five total variants. The below are each hammer-fired semi-automatic pistols operating in double action / single action (DA/SA), with a decocker and without a manual safety, unless noted otherwise.

First generation
These offerings feature a proprietary SIG accessory rail. It was originally developed as a .40 S&W caliber service pistol and introduced in June 1998, followed shortly by a version in .357 SIG. About a year later, a 9×19mm Parabellum variant was introduced and entered production in response to demand for the type.

 SP 2340 – chambered in .357 SIG or .40 S&W.
 SP 2009 – chambered in 9×19 mm.
 One model (P2009-9-BMS) features a manual safety and shortened trigger.
 SPC 2009 – compact version of the SP 2009, chambered in 9×19 mm.

Second generation
These offerings feature a Picatinny rail, and a trigger guard that is visibly different than the first generation variants. The design was selected in 2002 as a new service pistol for French police, intended to have a 20-year service life (until 2022), hence the model number.

 SP 2022 – chambered in 9×19 mm, .357 SIG or .40 S&W.
 Some models (such as E2022-9-BSS-MS) are available with a manual safety.
 SPC 2022 – compact version of the SP 2009, chambered in 9×19 mm.

Users

: SP 2022, Bulgarian military police
: Colombian National Police, several thousand SP2009  and 120,890 SP2022
: French law enforcement and internal security agencies (including the National Gendarmerie, National Police and French Customs), over 250,000 of SP 2022 (the largest single order for service handguns since World War II)
: Royal Malaysia Police (some 2,000 batches of SP2022 and SPC2022 pistols chambered in 9mm purchased in year 2007)
: SP 2022, National Police of Peru
: SP 2022, Republican National Guard and Public Security Police
: SPC 2009, Swiss Military Police (as the Pistole 03).
: Trinidad and Tobago Police Service
: Essex Police

References

External links 

SIG Pro SP 2022 instruction manual via Wayback Machine
SIG-Sauer SIG Pro at Modern Firearms
SIG SP2022 by Hickok45 via YouTube
SIG Pro FAQ via Wayback Machine

Post–Cold War weapons of Germany
9mm Parabellum semi-automatic pistols
.40 S&W semi-automatic pistols
.357 SIG semi-automatic pistols
Police weapons
Semi-automatic pistols of the United States
SIG Sauer semi-automatic pistols
Weapons and ammunition introduced in 1999